Charles Fenerty (January 1821 – 10 June 1892), was a Canadian inventor who invented the wood pulp process for papermaking, which was first adapted into the production of newsprint. Fenerty was also a poet (writing over 32 known poems).

Early life
Fenerty was born in Upper Falmouth, Nova Scotia. He was the youngest of three boys, all of whom worked for their father, a lumberman and farmer. During the winter months, the Fenertys would clear-cut the local forests for lumber, which they then transported to the family's lumber mill at Springfield Lake. The Fenertys shipped their lumber to the Halifax dockyards, where it was exported or used locally.

As a young man, Fenerty began writing poetry; his first (known) poem, written when he was 17 years old, was titled "The Prince's Lodge" (later retitled as "Passing Away" and published in 1888).  It described an abandoned, decaying home overlooking the Bedford Basin near Halifax. The lodge had been built decades prior by Prince Edward Augustus, Duke of Kent and Strathearn, who later returned to England.

Invention of paper from wood pulp
Each time Fenerty hauled lumber and produce to Halifax, he would pass the local paper mills, and sometimes stopped by to watch the process, since there were many similarities between lumber and paper mills. In those days paper was made from pulped rags, cotton and other plant fibres, a technique used for nearly 2000 years (see History of paper). Demand for paper was outstripping the supply of rags, and Europe started cutting down their shipments of cotton to North America.

Fenerty had learned that trees have fibres too, through discussions with the naturalist Titus Smith. At the age of 17 (in c.1838) he began his experiments of making paper from wood. By 1844, he had perfected the process (including bleaching the pulp to a white colour). In a letter written by a family member circa 1915 it is mentioned that Charles Fenerty had shown a crude sample of his paper to a friend named Charles Hamilton in 1840 (a relative of his future wife), though the family member in question would have been around 8 at the time.
On 26 October 1844 Charles Fenerty took a sample of his paper to Halifax's top newspaper, the Acadian Recorder, where he had written a letter on his newly invented paper saying:

Other inventors had used wood to make paper; in the 18th century a French scientist by the name of René Antoine Ferchault de Réaumur suggested that paper could be made from trees. His theory caught the interest of Matthias Koops, who in 1800 experimented with papermaking by compressing and adhering straw and wood shavings.

In about 1838 German weaver Friedrich Gottlob Keller read Réaumur's report. Unaware of Fenerty across the ocean, he experimented for a few years and, in 1845, a year after Fenerty's letter to the newspaper, filed for a patent in Germany for the ground wood pulp process for making modern paper. In that same year Henry Voelter bought the patent for about five hundred dollars and started making paper. His venture wasn't financially successful, and he later was unable to afford to renew his patent.  Voelter has been credited in Germany as the first to make paper from wood pulp.

Poetry and travel
Fenerty was also a well-known poet of his time, publishing more than 35 (known) poems. Some of the better known titles were: "Betula Nigra" (about a Black Birch tree), "Essay on Progress" (published in 1866), and "The Prince's Lodge" (about Prince Edward Augustus, Duke of Kent and Strathearn, written around 1838 and published in 1888). In October 1854, he won first prize for "Betula Nigra" at the Nova Scotia Industrial Exhibition.

Fenerty did extensive travelling throughout Australia between the years 1858 to 1865, living through the Australian gold rushes, and then returned to Halifax. He became involved with the Church and held several positions in Halifax: Wood Measurer, Census Taker, Health Warden, Tax Collector for his community, and Overseer of the Poor.

Death and legacy
Little attention was given to Fenerty's invention, and he himself never developed his process or took out a patent on it. It did mark the beginning to a new industry; today most people attribute F. G. Keller as the original inventor.

Pulped wood paper slowly began to be adopted by paper mills. German newspapers were the first to adopt the new paper, then other newspapers made the switch from rags to wood pulp.  Soon there were mills throughout Canada, the U.S., and Europe, and later the rest of the world. A wood pulp paper mill was erected near Fenerty's home town.  By the end of the 19th century almost all newspapers in the western world were using pulp wood newsprint.

Fenerty died on 10 June 1892 in his home in Lower Sackville, Nova Scotia, from a flu.

Poems by Charles Fenerty
 The Prince's Lodge (His first known poem, written in c.1837)
 Betula Nigra (His award-winning poem)
 Battle of the Alma
In Memoriam of James Montgomery
The Relic
Hid Treasure: Canto I
Hid Treasure: Canto II
Hid Treasure: Canto III
To a Rich Miser
The Saxon's Sentimental Journey
The Tao-Aspiring Poet
A Lilt of Skibbereen
Reason and Faith
Hymn
The Man of God
 Farewell to Australia (1865)
The Voyagers on Gennesaret
Keep the Heart Young
Essay on Progress
The Decline of Spain
Lex Talionis
The Blind Lady's Request
Early Piety
 Terra Nova
To a Meteorite
The Sentinel Rose
In Memoriam
The Wreck of the Atlantic
 Sir Provo Wallis (His last known poem, written in 1892)
Passing On
Eighteen Hundred and Two
Howe

Recognition 
On Canada Day in 1987, Canada Post featured Fenerty on one of a set of four stamps commemorating Canadian inventors in Communications.

Bibliography
Burger, Peter. Charles Fenerty and his Paper Invention. Toronto: Peter Burger, 2007. 
Carruthers, George. Paper in the Making. Toronto: The Garden City Press Co-Operative, 1947.
Crowley, David, Paul Heyer. Communication in History: Technology, Culture, Society, 5th ed. Boston: Pearson Allyn & Bacon, 2007.
Dictionary of Canadian Biography. Vol. I – XII. Toronto: University of Toronto Press, 1990.
Encyclopedia Canadiana. 10 vols. Toronto: Grolier of Canada Ltd., 1977.
Fenerty, Charles. Betula Nigra. Halifax: W. Cunnabell, 1855.
Fenerty, Charles. Essay on Progress. Halifax: James Bowes & Sons, 1866.
Fenerty, Charles. (Manuscript) "Hid Treasure" or the Labours of a Deacon–and other poems. Halifax: MS Pp 81, n/p, n/d (ca.1888). (Dalhousie University call Number: MS-2-158)
Fergusson, Dr. Charles Bruce. Charles Fenerty: The Life and Achievement of a Native of Sackville, Halifax County, N.S. Halifax: William Macnab & Son, 1955.
Halifax Herald, The, Halifax, Nova Scotia, 1840–1892.
Harvey, Robert Paton. Historic Sackville. Halifax: Nimbus Publishing Ltd, 2002.
Hunter, Dard. Papermaking: The History and Technique of an Ancient Craft. New York: Dover Publications, Inc. 1978.
Knott, Leonard L. The Children's Book about Pulp and Paper. Montreal: Editorial Associates, 1949.
Koops, Matthias. Historical account of the substances which have been used to describe events, and to convey ideas, from the earliest date, to the invention of paper. London: Printed by T. Burton, 1800.
MacBeath, George. Great Maritime Achievers in Science and Technology. Fredericton, NB: Goose Lane Editions, 2005.
MacFarlane, William Godsoe. "Fenerty, Charles". New Brunswick Bibliography: The Books and Writers of the Province. St. John, N.B., 1895: 30. (Available at the University of Toronto, CIHM no.: 09418).
Marble, Allen Everett. Nova Scotians at Home and Abroad. Windsor, NS: Lancelot Press Ltd, 1986.
Morgan, Henry J. "Fenerty, Charles". Bibliotheca Canadensis. Ottawa: G.E. Desbarats. 1867.
Mullane, George. Footprints Around and About Bedford Basin. Halifax: (Reprints from the Acadian Recorder), n/p, ca.1914. (CIHM no. 78665 U of T) 
NovaScotian, The, Halifax, Nova Scotia, 1830–1880.
Pönicke, Herbert. "Keller, Friedrich Gottlob". Neue Deutsche Biographie. Berlin: Duncker & Humblot, 1977.
Punch, Terrence Michael. Some Native Sons of Erin in Nova Scotia. Halifax: Petheric Press, 1980.
Punch, Terrence M. "Fenerty, Charles". Dictionary of Canadian Biography. (Vol. XII. 1891 to 1900). Toronto: University of Toronto Press, 1990: 311.
Punch, Terrence M. Nova Scotia Vital Statistics from Newspaper, 1818–1822. Halifax: Genealogical Association of the Royal Nova Scotia Historical Society, Publication No. 1, 1978.
Raddall, Thomas H. Halifax – Warden of the North. Toronto: McClelland and Stewart Ltd, 1977.
Schlieder, Wolfgang. Der Erfinder des Holzschliffs Friedrich Gottlob Keller. Leipzig, Germany: VEB Fachbuchverlag Leipzig, 1977.
Sittauer, Hans L. Friedrich Gottlob Keller. Leipzig: BSB B.G. Teubner Verlagsgesellschaft, 1982.
Tennant, Robert D. Jr. Millview: From Winter Cove to Salt Hill. Nova Scotia: n/p, n/d, (held at the Fultz Museum, Sackville, NS).
Walther Killy and Rudolf Vierhaus. "Keller, Friedrich Gottlob". Deutsche Biographische Enzyklopädie. Munich: Die Deutsche Bibliothek, 1997.
Watters, Reginald Eyre. A Check List of Canadian Literature and Background Materials: 1628–1950. Toronto: University of Toronto Press, 1959.

See also

Acadia Paper Mill
René Antoine Ferchault de Réaumur
Fiber crop
Invention in Canada
List of Canadian poets
List of Canadian writers
List of people on stamps of Canada
Paper engineering
Pulpwood
Technological and industrial history of Canada
The Greatest Canadian Invention
Timeline of historic inventions

References

External links
Dictionary of Canadian Biography Online
Biography at Fultz House Museum
The Official Charles Fenerty Website
Canadiana Online : Essay on Progress by Charles Fenerty
Canada Post : Charles Fenerty Stamp
The Canadian Encyclopedia 

Papermakers
1821 births
1892 deaths
Canadian inventors
People from Sackville, Nova Scotia
Colony of Nova Scotia people
19th-century Canadian poets
Canadian male poets
Deaths from influenza
Writers from Nova Scotia
19th-century Canadian male writers